Menominie is a common misspelling for:

Menominee
Menomonee
Menomonie